"Latex Messiah (Viva la Rebel in You)" is a song by the British rock singer Toyah Willcox, released in 2007.

Background
The song was written by Toyah and her collaborator Simon Darlow, and was produced by Darlow. It was her first single release since 1994 and also her first digital release. The track served as the lead single from Toyah's new studio album In the Court of the Crimson Queen which was released almost a year later. The song reached various download charts in iTunes Store, but did not enter the general singles chart in the UK.

Music videos
Several "guerilla footage" homemade videos were shot for the song in collaboration with photographer Dean Stockings. They were uploaded on Toyah's Myspace page and her official YouTube channel.

Track listing
 Digital single
 "Latex Messiah (Viva la Rebel in You)" – 3:53

Personnel
 Toyah Willcox – vocals
 Simon Darlow – all instruments, backing vocals, producing, mixing

References

2007 singles
2007 songs
Toyah Willcox songs
Songs written by Toyah Willcox
Songs written by Simon Darlow